Sebastian: Party Gras! is the second of three original albums inspired by Disney's The Little Mermaid film. Many of the songs are cover versions of classic calypso or reggae songs, or other songs recorded in a calypso or reggae style. All of the songs are performed by Samuel E. Wright as Sebastian the crab.

Track listing

Personnel
Credits for Party Gras! adapted from Allmusic, and from album liner notes.

 Terry Bates - assistant engineer
 Andy Grassi - assistant engineer
 Joe Pirrera - assistant engineer
 Willie Pevear - engineer, mixing
 Bruce Botnick - mastering
 Harold J. Kleiner - executive producer
 Eric Silver - associate producer
 Shepard Stern - producer
 Thomas Cain - backing vocals
 Erin Dorris - backing vocals

 Ricky Dorris - backing vocals
 Tionna Dorris - backing vocals
 Kim Fleming - backing vocals
 Vicki Hampton - backing vocals
 Shannon Holland - backing vocals
 Donna McElroy - backing vocals
 Michael Mishaw - backing vocals
 Tiffany Sims - backing vocals
 Tomeka Sims - backing vocals
 Kenneth "Scat" Springs - backing vocals
 Victor Wooten, Michael Rhodes - bass
 Larry Chaney - guitars
 Jeff Roach - synthesizers, programming
 Dale Armstrong - drums
 Bill Cuomo - keys
 The "No Clams" Horns - horns

References

External links

The Little Mermaid (franchise)
1991 albums
Walt Disney Records albums